In the Catholic Church, the Precepts of the Church, sometimes called the  Commandments of the Church, are certain laws considered binding on the faithful. As usually understood, they are moral and ecclesiastical, broad in character and limited in number. In modern times there are five. These specifically Catholic commandments flow from and lead to the Ten Commandments which are common to all the Abrahamic religions (except Islam).

Modern period

Catechism of the Catholic Church
The Catechism of the Catholic Church promulgates the following:

 You shall attend Mass on Sundays and holy days of obligation. 
 You shall confess your sins at least once a year.
 You shall humbly receive your Creator in Holy Communion at least during the Easter season.
 You shall observe the prescribed days of fasting and abstinence.
 You shall help to provide for the needs of the Church.

Compendium of the Catechism of the Catholic Church

The Compendium of the Catechism of the Catholic Church enumerates the same five:                                   

 
 to attend Mass on Sundays and other holy days of obligation and to refrain from work and activities which could impede the sanctification of those days; 
 to confess one's sins, receiving the sacrament of Reconciliation at least once each year; 
 to receive the sacrament of the Eucharist at least during the Easter season; 
 to abstain from eating meat and to observe the days of fasting established by the Church.
 to help to provide for the material needs of the Church, each according to his own ability.

The fourth Church Commandment is commonly remembered as abstinence from meat (but not fish) on Fridays (except solemnities), and abstinence-plus restriction to one meal only on Ash Wednesday and Good Friday. The details are quite various, including some countries to allow for a different way of penance on at least ordinary Fridays. The whole of Lent is of penitential character, though no specified practice is required.

Previously there were six commandments. The sixth being, "Not to marry persons within the forbidden degrees of kindred or otherwise prohibited by the Church; nor to solemnize marriage at the forbidden times."

Reasons
The first reason for the Church commandments is Christ's ability to liberate through his prescriptions for humanity. Secondly, Church authority, which has a right to be obeyed as delegated by Jesus, which common tradition subsumes under the Fourth Commandment. The first Church Commandment is obviously an explanation of the minimum requirements for hallowing the Lord's Day, with the specification that it is Mass, and not anything else, that needs to be heard, that the Lord's Day has been shifted from Saturday to Sunday, and that some other feasts are assigned by Church authority in remembrance of Our Lord, of His blessed Mother and of the Saints. The third Church Commandment is a specification to Our Lord's directive to eat His Flesh, reducible to the Third Commandment as well since it is an act of devotion. The second Church Commandment prescribes a preparation for fulfilling the third Church Commandment and was promulgated at the Fourth Council of the Lateran. What concerns the fourth Church Commandment, the Church believes that penance is of divine law, and the notion is general that fasting, as a penitential practice, is quite useful, citing such Scripture as "Be converted to Me with all your heart, in fasting". Thus again, the commanding act of the Church rather consists in the precisation. The necessity of providing for the needs of the Church results from the faithful belonging to one Mystical Body and is regulated in canons 1260 and 1262.

History

As early as the time of Constantine I, especial insistence was put upon the obligation to hear Mass on Sundays and Holy Days, to receive the sacraments and to abstain from contracting marriage at certain seasons. In the seventh-century Penitentiary of Theodore of Canterbury we find penalties imposed on those who contemn the Sunday.

According to a work written by Regino, the abbot of Prüm (d. 915), entitled Libri duo de synodalibus causis et disciplinis, the bishop should ask in his visitation:

The precepts here implied came to be regarded as special Commandments of the Church. Thus in a book of tracts of the thirteenth century attributed to Pope Celestine V (though the authenticity of this work has been denied) a separate tractate is given to the precepts of the Church and is divided into four chapters, the first of which treats of fasting, the second of confession and paschal Communion, the third of interdicts on marriage, and the fourth of tithes. 

In the fourteenth century Ernest von Parduvitz, Archbishop of Prague, instructed his priests to explain in popular sermons the principal points of the catechism, the Our Father, the Creed, the Commandments of God and of the Church (Hafner, loc. cit., 115). A century later (1470) the catechism of Dietrick Coelde, the first, it is said, to be written in German, explicitly set forth that there were five Commandments of the Church. 

In his Summa Theologica (part I, tit. xvii, p. 12) Antoninus of Florence (1439) enumerates ten precepts of the Church universally binding on the faithful. These are:

to observe certain feasts
to keep the prescribed fasts
to attend Mass on Sundays and Holy Days
to confess once a year
to receive Holy Communion during paschal time
to pay tithes
to abstain from any act upon which an interdict has been placed entailing excommunication
to refrain also from any act interdicted under pain of excommunication latæ sententiæ
to avoid association with the excommunicated
finally, not to attend Mass or other religious functions celebrated by a priest living in open concubinage.

In the sixteenth century Martin Aspilcueta (1586), gives a list of four principal precepts of obligation: 

to fast at certain prescribed times
to pay tithes
to go to confession once a year
and to receive Holy Communion at Easter.

At this time there began to appear many popular works in defence of the authority of the Church and setting forth her precepts. Such among others were the Summa Doctrinæ Christianæ (1555) of Peter Canisius, and the Doctrina Christiana of Bellarmine (1589).

See also 

 Ten Commandments in Catholic theology

Notes

References

Further reading 

 

Catholic theology and doctrine
Commandments